These are the results of the 2004 Asian Indoor Athletics Championships which took place on 6–8 February 2004 in Tehran, Iran.

Men's results

60 meters

Heats – 6 February

Final – 6 February

200 meters

Heats – 7 February

Semifinals – 7 February

Final – 7 February

400 meters

Heats – 7 February

Final – 8 February

800 meters

Heats – 6 February

Final – 7 February

1500 meters
8 February

3000 meters
8 February

60 meters hurdles

Heats – 8 February

Final – 8 February

4 × 400 meters relay
8 February

5000 meters walk
8 February

High jump
7 February

Pole vault
8 February

Long jump
6 February

Triple jump
8 February

shot put
8 February

Heptathlon
6–7 February

Women's results

60 meters

Heats – 6 February

Final – 6 February

200 meters

Heats – 7 February

Final – 7 February

400 meters

Heats – 7 February

Final – 8 February

800 meters
6 February

1500 meters
7 February

3000 meters
8 February

60 meters hurdles
7 February

4 × 400 meters relay
8 February

3000 meters walk
6 February

High jump
6 February

Pole vault
7 February

Long jump
7 February

Triple jump
8 February

Shot put
6 February

Pentathlon
8 February

References
Results

Asian Indoor Championships
Events at the Asian Indoor Athletics Championships